At the 1906 Summer Olympics in Athens, 21 competitive events in athletics were held. A total of 65 medals (21 gold, 23 silver, 21 bronze) were awarded. Now called the Intercalated Games, the 1906 Games are no longer considered as an official Olympic Games by the International Olympic Committee (IOC).

The marathon distance was 41.775 km according to a contemporary Greek newspaper. The pentathlon event in the 1906 Games consisted of a standing long jump, discus throw (ancient style), javelin throw, 192 metre run, and a Greco-Roman wrestling match. A stone throw was held with a 6.4 kg weight.

Medal summary

Medal table

References

 
1906 Intercalated Games events
1906
1906 in athletics (track and field)
1906 Olympics
1906 Intercalated Games